Boothby Graffoe is a village and civil parish in the North Kesteven district of Lincolnshire, England. The population of the civil parish at the 2011 census was 223.

Boothby Graffoe Grade II listed Anglican parish church is dedicated to St Andrew The church was re-built in 1842. According to the parish registers of Wellingore, Boothby Graffoe's original church was destroyed by a T8-9 Tornado (the strongest ever recorded in England) in 1666.

To the west of the village lies the earthwork remains of Somerton Castle.

See also
"Boothby Graffoe", Genuki.org.uk. Retrieved 30 June 2011
Spring line villages
Boothby Graffoe (Comedian)

References

External links

Villages in Lincolnshire
Civil parishes in Lincolnshire
North Kesteven District